Julika Jenkins (born 20 October 1971) is a German actress. She lives in Berlin with her partner, actor Arnd Klawitter. She has appeared in stage, television, and film productions in Switzerland and Germany. She is best known for her role as Claudia Tiedemann in the German Netflix original series Dark.

Biography
Jenkins grew up in Heidelberg, the daughter of a Welsh and German couple. She completed her acting training at the Otto Falckenberg School of the Performing Arts in Munich. She made her theatre debut in 1993 in a production of The Moon in the Grass by Robert Wilson at the Munich Kammerspiele theatre. From 1994 to 1999, Jenkins belonged to the ensemble at the Theater am Neumarkt in Zurich, Switzerland. From 1999 until 2003, she performed at the Schaubühne theatre on Lehniner Platz in Berlin. Guest performances followed at a number of theatres in Switzerland and Germany.

In 2006, Jenkins got a role in the Fredi M. Murer film Vitus, where she starred alongside real-life piano prodigy Teo Gheorghiu, as well as Bruno Ganz and Urs Jucker. In 2009, Jenkins appeared again on the big screen next to Jean-Paul Belmondo in A Man and His Dog, a remake of the Vittorio De Sica classic Umberto D.
Since 2017, she has appeared in the Netflix original series Dark as Claudia Tiedemann.

Selected filmography

References

External links
 
 Julika Jenkins at Funke-Stertz talent agency
 Julika Jenkins at The Agency

1971 births
Living people
German film actresses
German people of Welsh descent
German people of British descent